Haplomitrium mnioides is a species of liverwort from Japan.

References
Tropicos entry

Plants described in 1875
Flora of Japan
Calobryales